Denis or Dennis Hurley may refer to:
Denis Hurley (bishop) (1915–2004), South African Catholic clergyman
Denis Hurley (rugby union) (born 1984), Irish rugby union player
 Denis Hurley (hurler), Irish hurler, Gaelic footballer and selector
Denis M. Hurley (1843–1899), American politician
Denis Reagan Hurley (born 1937), American judge